Tantsud tähtedega 2010 is the fourth season of the Estonian version of Dancing with the Stars, and was broadcast on the Estonian television channel Kanal 2 starting on 10 October. The hosts were Mart Sander and Kaisa Oja. The jury members were Ants Tael, Merle Klandorf and Jüri Nael.

Couples

Scores

Red numbers indicate the lowest score for each week.
Green numbers indicate the highest score for each week.
 indicates the couple eliminated that week.
 indicates the winning couple.
 indicates the runners-up.

Songs and Individual Scoring

Week 1
Individual judges scores in charts below (given in parentheses) are listed in this order from left to right: Ants Tael, Merle Klandorf and Jüri Nael.

Running order

Week 2
Individual judges scores in charts below (given in parentheses) are listed in this order from left to right: Ants Tael, Merle Klandorf and Jüri Nael.

Running order

Week 3
Individual judges scores in charts below (given in parentheses) are listed in this order from left to right: Ants Tael, Merle Klandorf and Jüri Nael.

Running order

Week 4
Individual judges scores in charts below (given in parentheses) are listed in this order from left to right: Ants Tael, Merle Klandorf and Jüri Nael.

Running order

Week 5
Individual judges scores in charts below (given in parentheses) are listed in this order from left to right: Ants Tael, Merle Klandorf and Jüri Nael.

Running order

Week 6
Individual judges scores in charts below (given in parentheses) are listed in this order from left to right: Ants Tael, Merle Klandorf and Jüri Nael.

Running order

Week 7
Individual judges scores in charts below (given in parentheses) are listed in this order from left to right: Ants Tael, Merle Klandorf and Jüri Nael.

Running order

Week 8
Individual judges scores in charts below (given in parentheses) are listed in this order from left to right: Ants Tael, Merle Klandorf and Jüri Nael.

Running order

Average Chart

Couples' highest and lowest scoring dances

Highest and lowest scoring performances
The best and worst performances in each dance according to the judges' marks are as follows:

Dance Chart

 Highest scoring dance
 Lowest scoring dance

References

Season 2010
2010s Estonian television series
2010 Estonian television seasons
Estonian reality television series